Mexican poppy is a common name for several plants and may refer to:

 Hunnemannia species
 Argemone mexicana
 Argemone ochroleuca